The 1st Battalion 9th Marines (1/9) was an infantry battalion of the United States Marine Corps. Formed during World War I, it served until the mid-2000s when it was deactivated to make room for one of three light armor reconnaissance battalions. During the Vietnam War, 1/9 sustained an especially high casualty rate, such that it received the nickname "The Walking Dead".

In late 2005, the battalion was reactivated and attached to the 8th Marine Regiment at MCB Camp Lejeune. Although the first full company has deployed, 1/9 was not expected to be ready for deployment as a battalion until May 2008. On 19 April 2007, 1/9 was officially stood up with all of its subordinate units fully manned.

As of 29 August 2014 the battalion has been deactivated due to a force shaping initiative and downsizing of the Marine Corps. On the occasion of this deactivation, one of its former officers lauded: "Not a better battalion in the world".

Subordinate units
The battalion was composed of four rifle infantry companies and one headquarters and services company:

 Alpha Company
 Bravo Company
 Charlie Company
 Delta Company
 Weapons Company
 Headquarters & Service Company to include Scout Sniper Platoon; Corpsmen; Battalion Command Group Sections (Operations/Plans/Training, Intelligence, Supply, and Administration) along with the Battalion Aid Section.  H&S Co. also had a provisional rifle platoon composed of all Marines in H&S in the '65-'66 time period.  Many of these personnel were assigned to each of the four rifle infantry companies. Delta Company was never stood back up for the GWOT.

History

World War I
The battalion was activated on 20 November 1917 at Quantico, Virginia as the 9th Regiment. During December 1917 they were deployed to Guantanamo Bay, Cuba, and attached to the 3rd Provisional Brigade. They were relocated during August 1918 to Fort Crockett, Galveston, Texas, and detached from 3rd Provisional Brigade. They moved to Philadelphia, Pennsylvania during April 1919 and deactivated 25 April 1919.

World War II
The battalion was activated on 1 March 1942 at San Diego, California and were assigned to the 2nd Marine Regiment of the 2nd Marine Division. They were reassigned during August 1942 to Amphibious Corps, Pacific Fleet and shortly thereafter relocated during September 1942 to Marine Corps Base Camp Pendleton, California and reassigned to the 3rd Marine Division. They deployed during January–February 1943 to Auckland, New Zealand and from there participated in the following World War II Campaigns:

Bougainville Campaign (1 November 1943 – 21 August 1945)
Northern Solomons (January 1942 – 21 August 1945)
Battle of Guam (21 July – 10 August 1944)
Battle of Iwo Jima (19 February – 26 March 1945)

Following the surrender of Japan the battalion was detached during December 1945 from the 3rd Marine Division and returned during December 1945 to Camp Pendleton, California. They were formally deactivated on 31 December 1945.

Vietnam War
During the Vietnam War, the unit earned the name "The Walking Dead" for its high casualty rate. The battalion endured the longest sustained combat and suffered the highest killed in action (KIA) rate in Marine Corps history, especially during the Battle of July Two. The battalion was engaged in combat for 47 months and 7 days, from 15 June 1965 to 19 October 1966 and 11 December 1966 to 14 July 1969. Based on a typical battalion strength of 800 Marines and Navy hospital corpsmen, 2,892 Marines passed through the unit over those 47 months; 25.89% (747) were killed in action (KIA) and 0.0007% (2) were missing in action (MIA). Of course, this statistic is misleading, since it fails to take note of the significant number of replacements that the battalion continually received to make up for wounded, dead, and men who transferred out for other reasons. In addition, since an individual marine's tour of duty in Vietnam was 13 months, the statistic assumes that, because the battalion did not complete 4 full tours of 13 months (52 months), then the battalion only received 47 months and 7 days worth of men, which is equally implausible--no one knew at the 39 month point that the battalion would be leaving in only 8 months, so the Marine Corps would not have deducted from the standard strength of 800. In short, far more than 2,892 men passed through the unit (certainly more than 4,000), so the above statistic is erroneous, although serving in 1/9 indeed proved very dangerous.

1/9 participated in the following operations during the Vietnam War:

1980s and 1990s
During most of the 1980s and 1990s, the battalion rotated between Camp Pendleton, California and Camp Hansen, Okinawa, Japan. This consisted of six months overseas and 18 months in California.

1st Battalion, 9th Marines, Fleet Marine Force(REIN), Camp Pendleton, California, served on several overseas deployments. 1/9 was re-designated as Battalion Landing Team One Slant Nine (BLT 1/9) and deployed as the infantry element of the 13th MEU/SOC and 11th MEU/SOC. During its deployments, the Marines and Sailors of 1/9 became a Marine Expeditionary Unit (MEU) that was Special Operations Capable (MEU/SOC). The Marines and Sailors were trained in Counter Terrorism, Downed Airman Rescue, Embassy evacuations, SPIE rigging, fast roping, rubber raiding in their inflatable boats for boarding and insertion, and rappelling. Much of the training was spent on foreign Soviet weapons and Soviet military doctrine. The Battalion served in the Gulf War.

Operation Restore Hope

In September 1993, 1st Battalion 9th Marines commanded by LtCol. Silva were the battalion deployed as the ground combat element of the 13th Marine Expeditionary Unit. The 13th MEU arrived off the coast of Somalia in early October onboard warships from Amphibious Squadron 5 USS New Orleans LPH-11, USS Denver LPD-9, USS Cayuga LST-1186 and USS Comstock LSD-45 in direct response to the Battle of Mogadishu fought on 3 and 4 October 1993. The 13th MEU and 22nd Marine Expeditionary Unit formed the 1st Marine Expeditionary Brigade (1st MEB) commanded by General Peter Pace. 1st MEB remained on station ready to provide support to United States and United Nations forces.

1st MEB was disestablished when the 22nd MEU (SOC) was reassigned to the Mediterranean area of operations in mid-November. The 13th MEU remained as the principle rapid response force in support of the joint task force and participated in Operation Restore Hope and Operation Continue Hope. They also developed and executed two humanitarian assistance operations. The first, Operation Show Care took place in the cities of Marka and Qoryooley from 11–14 November. From 1–3 December 1993, Operation More Care was conducted in the Old Port of Mogadishu. Both operations provided needed medical and dental assistance to Somali citizens.

The 13th MEU (SOC) continued its presence mission through January, providing aircraft for the "Eyes Over Mogadishu" missions as well as sniper support at the United States Embassy compound. On 2 February 1994, the 24th MEU (SOC) relieved the 13th MEU (SOC).

The battalion was deactivated on 9 September 1994 and redesignated 2nd Battalion 1st Marines. The battalion remained inactive from 1994 through 2007.

Global War on Terror

In April 2005 the Marine Corps began reactivating the 1st Battalion 9th Marines. In April 2006, after only a 30-day work-up cycle, Alpha Company deployed in support of Operation Iraqi Freedom and completed a successful six-month deployment to Forward Operating Base Grizzly in Camp Ashraf, Iraq. During this time the company conducted security and stabilization operations north of Al Khalis in the Diyala Governorate, working jointly with Military Police, Cavalry and Field Artillery units from the National Guard. Alpha Company returned in October 2006 without the loss of any Marines. 1st Battalion 9th Marines was officially reactivated in April 2007. In March 2008, the Battalion deployed to Al Anbar Province on a 7-month deployment, and took over sole responsibility of Ar Ramadi and all security missions in the immediate area. The Battalion was divided into Police Transition Teams (PTT) and worked directly with Iraqi Police developing them into a more efficient professional police force to provide a more safe and secure living environment for the local populace. 1/9 returned from deployment in October 2008.

In May 2011, 1/9 deployed to Helmand Province, Afghanistan. This would be the first time the "Walking Dead" would fight in Operation Enduring Freedom in Afghanistan. The Battalion detached Alpha Company and attached it to 3rd Battalion 6th Marines in the city of Marjah for this deployment. The deployment was a success, and no Marines were lost in action. From September, 2012 to December, 2012, Alpha Company deployed to Al Jaber, Kuwait, providing security forces for MAG-40. 1/9 deployed to Helmand Province Afghanistan from Sept 2013 to May 2014 in support of operation Enduring Freedom and shortly after returning from this deployment the unit cased their colors again.

Medal of Honor recipients

The Medal of Honor is the highest military decoration awarded by the United States. It is bestowed on a member of the United States armed forces who distinguishes himself "conspicuously by gallantry and intrepidity at the risk of his life above and beyond the call of duty while engaged in an action against an enemy of the United States". The following table contains the names of the men who were recipients of the Medal of Honor while serving in 1/9. They are listed in accordance to the "Date of Action" in which the Medal of Honor citation was made.

Navy Cross recipients

The Navy Cross is the highest medal that can be awarded by the Department of the Navy and the second highest award given for valor. The following names are of the men who were recipients of the Navy Cross while serving in 1/9.

 LCpl Jordan C. Haerter (posthumous)
 1stSgt Jettie Rivers, Jr. (posthumous - Promoted to 2ndLt)
 SSgt Leon R. Burns
 2ndLt William J. Christman III (posthumous)
 1stLt Gatlin J. Howell (posthumous)
 Capt William M. Keys
 Capt Albert C. Slater
 LCpl Dana C. Darnell
 1stLt Lee Herron (posthumous)
 LCpl Michael Edward Stewart (posthumous)
 2nd Lt George Malone
 LCpl. James Stogner

Notable former members
Joseph F. Dunford, Jr.
Walter Fillmore

Unit awards

A unit citation or commendation is an award bestowed upon an organization for the action cited. Members of the unit who participated in said actions are allowed to wear on their uniforms the awarded unit citation. 1st Battalion, 9th Marines has been presented with the following awards:

See also

List of United States Marine Corps battalions
Organization of the United States Marine Corps
Wallace Terry, profiled 1/9 member Private First Class Reginald "Malik" Edwards in Bloods: An Oral History of the Vietnam War by Black Veterans (1984), pages 3–17

Notes

References

Web

 1st Battalion 9th Marines' official website.  Accessed on 10 July 2006.

 Official Website of the 1/9 Network
 1/9 Tribute site
 Pike, Thomas,Operations and Intelligence, I Corps Reporting February 1969, 

Infantry battalions of the United States Marine Corps
Inactive units of the United States Marine Corps